The Slim River railway station is a Malaysian train station stationed at the north eastern side of and named after the town of Slim River, Muallim District, Perak.

The station is owned by Keretapi Tanah Melayu and provides KTM ETS services. Built in 1903, the original station is among the oldest of the railway stations in Malaysia. In March 2007, as part of the electrified double tracking project between Rawang and Ipoh, it was rebuilt, with the old station building being retained.  At one end of this station, there is a freight yard. It was made prior to the Rawang-Ipoh Electrified Double Tracking Project.

Location and locality 
The station is located exactly in Slim River town, and is accessible by road either from Federal Route 1 or Route A134 (Besout - Kuala Slim - Slim River).

The station not only serves Slim River and the surrounding areas, but also FELDA Trolak and FELDA Besout settlement areas due to their reasonably near distance between those places and this station, as well as Ulu Bernam estates. Slim River Vocational College and Trolak campus of MARA Junior Science College also located near here.

See also
 Rail transport in Malaysia

External links
 Slim River Railway Station

KTM ETS railway stations
Muallim District
Railway stations in Perak
Railway stations opened in 1903